Putnam State Forest, officially known as C.C. Putnam State Forest, covers   in Lamoille and Washington County in Vermont. The forest is managed by the Vermont Department of Forests, Parks, and Recreation in parts of Stowe, Elmore,
Waterbury, Worcester and Middlesex.

Activities in the forest include hiking, cross-country skiing, snowshoeing, and wildlife viewing.

The forest is located in the Worcester Range, part of the Green Mountains, and includes Mount Hunger, Mount Putnam and Mount Worcester. All the land above 2,500 feet elevation is designated as Worcester Range Natural Area, an area of 4,032 acres.

An 80-acre section in Stowe is designated as the Moss Glen Falls Natural Area (Stowe) and features one of the highest waterfalls in the state, with a total drop of over 100 feet.

References

External links
Official website

Vermont state forests
Protected areas of Washington County, Vermont
Protected areas of Lamoille County, Vermont
Stowe, Vermont
Elmore, Vermont
Waterbury, Vermont
Worcester, Vermont
Middlesex, Vermont